Louis Coderre,  (November 1, 1865 – March 29, 1935) was a Canadian politician.

Born in St Ours, Canada East, he was a lawyer before being elected to the House of Commons of Canada in the Quebec riding of Hochelaga in the 1908 federal election. A Conservative, he was re-elected in 1911. From 1912 to 1915, he was the Secretary of State of Canada and the Minister of Mines from 1913 to 1915.

Electoral record 

|-

| style="width: 160px"|Nationalist
|Léopold Doyon
|align=right|2,003
|align=right|31.90
|align=right|
|-

References

External links
 Louis Coderre at biographi.ca

1865 births
1935 deaths
Conservative Party of Canada (1867–1942) MPs
Members of the House of Commons of Canada from Quebec
Members of the King's Privy Council for Canada